The Smart #1 (stylised as "smart #1") is a battery electric subcompact crossover SUV developed and produced by Smart Automobile, a joint venture between Mercedes-Benz Group and Geely Holding. It is the first vehicle produced by the joint venture. The model is based on the Sustainable Experience Architecture (SEA) electric vehicle platform developed by Geely.

Overview
The production version was unveiled on 7 April 2022. It was developed under the codename HX11, with Mercedes-Benz providing the design while Geely handled engineering and production.

Prices for the European market were announced in September 2022.

#1 Brabus 
A performance version with the Brabus branding was unveiled in August 2022. Exterior changes includes red accents on the bumpers, intakes, door sills, mirror caps, roof and improved brake calipers to handle the extra power, and a matte gray exterior finish and black emblems. It was released in Europe in September 2022.

Safety
In autumn 2022, the Smart #1 was tested for automotive safety by Euro NCAP. It received five stars out of a possible five.

Concept 
The vehicle was previewed by the Concept #1, which was showcased at the 2021 International Motor Show Germany (IAA) in September 2021.

References

External links
 Official press release

1
Cars introduced in 2022
Mini sport utility vehicles
Crossover sport utility vehicles
Production electric cars
Rear-wheel-drive vehicles
Euro NCAP small off-road
Electric concept cars